How the Telephone Talks is a 1919 American silent educational documentary film made by Bray Studios. It demonstrates how the telephone works with a series of demonstrations and animated diagrams. The film was released on April 27, 1919.

References

External links
How the Telephone Talks at the Internet Movie Database

1919 films
American silent short films
American black-and-white films
American documentary films
1919 documentary films
1910s American films